The Dingli Radar is a large radar installation located in the Dingli area of Malta. It is used to monitor air traffic in the Maltese airspace and is operated by the Maltese Air Traffic Control. The radar is a key component of the country's air traffic management system, and it plays a critical role in ensuring aviation safety in the region.

History 
The first radar station in the Maltese Islands, the Dingli Radar, was established at Dingli Cliffs on March 27, 1939. Its function was to find nearby airplanes. The British also constructed and made use of an underground complex during World War II. The system established a triangulation network that connected Dingli Cliffs to Tas-Silg and Wardija, and it sent the data it had collected there for additional analysis to the Lascaris War Rooms in Valletta. The plotters used the intelligence to mark the locations of enemy aircraft on a map so that RAF fighters could intercept them.  The British also installed a radio telegraphy cabin among other things. When the Maltese took over control of the air traffic systems from the British forces in 1979, the development of today's radar installation began in the 1980s. Malta Air Traffic Services Ltd.'s Technical Station now handles all of the Radar's technical requirements. It manages all air traffic from Tunisia to Crete that passes through Malta's Flight Information Area.

References 

Dingli
Government buildings in Malta
Radar stations